Fair Oaks is a historic farmstead at 23718 New Mountain Rd. in Loudoun County, Virginia, near the village of Aldie.  The -story wood-frame Italianate style house was built in 1881 by Alexander Moore, whose family operated the Aldie Mill for many years.  The most prominent exterior decorative feature is the front porch, which features a delicately scroll-sawn balustrade and decorative brackets.  Most of its interior woodwork has been preserved.  The farmstead includes three other buildings dating to the same period, as well as the 1844 Moore family cemetery.

The property was listed on the National Register of Historic Places in 2014.

See also
National Register of Historic Places listings in Loudoun County, Virginia

References

Farms on the National Register of Historic Places in Virginia
National Register of Historic Places in Loudoun County, Virginia
Italianate architecture in Virginia
Houses in Loudoun County, Virginia